The Apostolic Nunciature to Kuwait is an ecclesiastical office of the Catholic Church in Kuwait. It is a diplomatic post of the Holy See, whose representative is called the Apostolic Nuncio with the rank of an ambassador.

List of papal representatives
Apostolic Pro-Nuncios
Alfredo Bruniera (7 July 1969 – 4 March 1975)
Jean-Édouard-Lucien Rupp (4 March 1975 - 13 July 1978)
Antonio del Giudice (22 December 1978 - 20 August 1982) 
Luigi Conti (19 November 1983 - 17 January 1987)
Marian Oleś (28 November 1987 - 1991)
Apostolic Nuncios
Pablo Puente Buces (25 May 1993 - 31 July 1997)
Antonio Maria Vegliò (2 October 1997 - 13 December 1999)
Giuseppe De Andrea (28 June 2001 - 27 August 2005)
Paul-Mounged El-Hachem (27 August 2005 - 2 December 2009)
Petar Rajič (2 December 2009 - 15 June 2015)
Francisco Montecillo Padilla (5 April 2016 – 17 April 2020)
Eugene Nugent (7 January 2021 – present)

See also
Apostolic Delegation to the Arabian Peninsula
Nunciature website

References

 
Holy See
Kuwait